Brentford Football Club is an English professional football club based in Brentford, Hounslow, London. Between 1897 and 1920, the first team competed in the London League, Southern League and Western League. Since 1920, the first team has competed in the Football League, the Premier League and other nationally and internationally organised competitions. All players who have been awarded the club's Supporters' Player of the Year and Players' Player of the Year awards are listed below.

Background 
The Brentford Supporters' Player of the Year award is chosen by members of the Brentford Supporters Club and was first presented to full back Ken Coote at the end of the 1961–62 season. The award has been presented annually since, with the exception of the 1967–68 and 1968–69 seasons. The presentation is traditionally made in May each year at the Big Red Ball awards dinner, with the winner receiving the Cyril Tyler Cup. Bob Booker was the first winner of the current cup, in 1983.

The Brentford Players' Player of the Year award is chosen by the members of that season's first team squad and was first presented to goalkeeper Chic Brodie at the end of the 1969–70 season. The award has not been presented with such regularity as the Supporters' Player of the Year award and midfielder Jackie Graham has received the trophy more than any other player, on three occasions.

Players who won both awards in a single season are Michael Allen, Bob Booker, Peter Gelson, Terry Hurlock, Alan Judge, Chris Kamara, Pat Kruse, Neal Maupay, Andrew McCulloch, Keith Millen, Christian Nørgaard, Gary Phillips and Danis Salman. Terry Evans is the only player to win both awards twice.

Key

Playing positions

Player of the Year winners

Other Player of the Year winners

References 

Brentford F.C. players
Brentford F.C.
Brentford F.C.-related lists
Association football player non-biographical articles